Siling labuyo is a small chili pepper cultivar that developed in the Philippines after the Columbian Exchange. It belongs to the species Capsicum frutescens and is characterized by triangular fruits which grow pointing upwards. The fruits and leaves are used in traditional Philippine cuisine. The fruit is pungent, ranking at 80,000 to 100,000 heat units in the Scoville Scale.

The cultivar name is Tagalog, and literally translates to "wild chili." It is also known simply as labuyo or labuyo chili. It is also sometimes known as Filipino bird's eye, to differentiate it from the Thai bird's eye chili. Both are commonly confused with each other in the Philippines, though they are cultivars of two different species. Siling labuyo is one of two common kinds of local chili found in the Philippines, the other being siling haba (a Capsicum annuum cultivar).

It is listed in the Ark of Taste international catalog of endangered heritage foods of the Philippines by the Slow Food movement.

Taxonomy and names
Siling labuyo is officially known under the cultivar name Capsicum frutescens 'Siling labuyo'. It belongs to the species Capsicum frutescens. Related cultivars to 'Siling labuyo' include 'Tabasco', 'Malagueta', and 'Peri-peri'.

The common name is Tagalog for "wild chili", from sili ("chili") and the enclitic suffix -ng, and labuyo ("growing wild", also a term for wild chicken or junglefowl). Other local names for it include chileng bundok, siling palay, pasitis, pasite (Tagalog); katumbal, kutitot, siling kolikot (Bisaya); katumba or lara jangay (Tausug); sili ti diablo (Ilocano); lada,sambalas, rimorimo (Bicolano); paktin (Ifugao); and luya tiduk (Maranao).

Description

They produce small greenish-white flowers with purple stamens. The fruits are very pungent and are characteristically borne erect (pointing upwards). Immature fruits are deep green in color and usually ripen to a vivid red. Depending on maturity and the variety, they can display a range of other colors, including yellow, orange, white, or a vivid purple. Flowers and fruits are often clustered in groups of 2 to 3 at a node.

Siling labuyo fruits are small but are very hot. It measures around 80,000-100,000 Scoville units which is at the lower end of the range for the hotter habanero chili. At one time it was even listed as the hottest chili in the Guinness Book of World Records but other hotter varieties of chili have since been identified.

Ingredient in cooking
Although not as central in Filipino cuisine as bird's eye chilies are in other cuisines of Southeast Asia, it is still an often-used ingredient. Its leaves are usually consumed as a vegetable, such as in dishes like tinola.

The most common use of siling labuyo, however, is in dipping sauces (sawsawan), which almost universally accompanies fried or grilled Filipino dishes. Unlike in western cuisines, these dipping sauces are created by the diner according to their preferences and are not made beforehand. Siling labuyo is almost always offered as an optional spicy element, alongside calamansi, soy sauce, vinegar, and patis (Filipino fish sauce).

Siling labuyo is also an essential ingredient in palapa, a sweet and spicy condiment made with scallions, coconut, ginger, and turmeric that is central to the cuisine of the Maranao people.

Siling labuyo can also used to make Filipino-style spiced vinegar (like sinamak and sukang pinakurat) which is also used as a dipping sauce. Instead of mixing fresh chilis on the table, the vinegar itself is infused with a large amount of siling labuyo and other spices and stored in bottles or mason jars. They can be kept for long periods in the refrigerator and their taste develops with time.

Natural pesticide use
Siling labuyo can be used as a natural pesticide on crops in the Philippines. The fruit, skin and seeds of siling labuyo are all effective for ants, aphids, caterpillars, Colorado beetle, cabbage worms, warehouse and storage pests.

Integrated Pest Management (IPM) technology suggests that natural pest control mechanisms are beneficial and that the growth of a healthy crop with the least possible disruption to agro-ecosystems is encouraged.

Commonly confused cultivars
Several introduced chili cultivars are increasingly being mislabeled as "siling labuyo" in Philippine markets (especially in Luzon), because these cultivars are generally easier to grow and harvest than siling labuyo. Their color and shape are also more consistent and they have a longer shelf life, but they are regarded as less spicy than siling labuyo.

These mislabeled cultivars include the red bird's eye chili ("Thai chili"), which is actually a chili pepper cultivar from a different species (Capsicum annuum) that came by way of Thailand. Their fruits, unlike C. frutescens, are borne on the plant drooping down. In Luzon, siling tingala and siling tari, high-yield F1 hybrids of C. frutescens and C. annuum from Taiwan are also commonly sold as siling labuyo. While they have C. frutescens ancestry (the fruits are also borne somewhat erect), they are much longer and uniformly red, similar to Thai bird's eye chilis.

See also
Siling haba
List of Capsicum cultivars

References

External links

Spices
Chili peppers
Medicinal plants
Capsicum cultivars